"Zemër" is a song by Kosovo-Albanian singer and songwriter Dhurata Dora and Algerian rapper Soolking. The song was entirely written by both artists themselves alongside Albanian producer Big Bang who was additionally hired for the production process of the song. The song was commercially successful throughout Europe peaking within the top thirty in Albania, Belgium, Switzerland and France. It was certified platinum by the Syndicat National de l'Édition Phonographique for selling over 200,000 units in France. For further promotion, the song was performed by both artists on various occasions among others in Zürich and Algiers.

Background and composition 

"Zemër" was written by Dhurata Dora and Soolking alongside Kosovo-Albanian producer Big Bang who also has handled the production process for the song. In terms of music notation, the song was composed in  time and is performed in the key of B minor in common time with a tempo of 157 beats per minute.

Music video and promotion 

The accompanying music video for "Zemër" was premiered onto the YouTube channel of Redbox Entertainment on the 19 April 2019. The official music video was shot in the Amadeus Palace in the city of Tirana by Max Production, which has previously worked with singer on various singles. The song was in 2019 the most popular and most watched music video on YouTube in Switzerland.

Personnel 

Credits adapted from Tidal and YouTube.

 Dhurata Dorasongwriting, vocals
 Soolkingsongwriting, vocals
 Big Bangcomposing, producing, programming

Charts

Certifications

Release history

References 

2019 singles
2019 songs
Dhurata Dora songs 
Albanian-language songs
French-language Albanian songs
Song recordings produced by Big Bang